A list of films produced in Pakistan in 1981 and in the Urdu language:

1981

See also
1981 in Pakistan

External links
 Search Pakistani film - IMDB.com

1981
Pakistani
Films